Eduard Vyacheslavovich Posylayev (born 15 December 1966) is a former Russian professional footballer.

Club career
He made his professional debut in the Soviet First League in 1986 for FC SKA Rostov-on-Don.

See also
Football in Russia

References

1966 births
Sportspeople from Taganrog
Living people
Soviet footballers
Russian footballers
Association football defenders
FC SKA Rostov-on-Don players
FC Rostov players
FC Lada-Tolyatti players
FC Zhemchuzhina Sochi players
FC Kuban Krasnodar players
Russian Premier League players